Two flags were used as the flag of the South African Republic, which existed from 1852 to 1877, 1881 to 1902, and 1914-15:  (1) the so-called 'Vierkleur' from 1857 to 1874, and again from 1875 to 1877 and 1881 to 1902, and (2) the so-called 'Burgers Flag' from 1874 to 1875.  They were superseded by the flag of Transvaal. The Vierkleur was also used by the South African Republic declared in 1914 during the Maritz Rebellion, which lasted into February 1915.

History
In 1856, the Voortrekker territories north of the Vaal River agreed to unite as the "South African Republic". A constitution was drawn up and a flag designed. The flag, known as the Vierkleur was raised in Potchefstroom on 6 January 1857, and was ratified by the Volksraad of the South African Republic (legislature) on 18 February 1858. The Vierkleur was flown until October 1874.    

The new flag, introduced by state president Thomas François Burgers, was approved by the Volksraad on 24 October 1874. It was an improved version of a flag which some of the Voortrekkers are believed to have used in the 1830s and '40s. However, it was very unpopular, and on 10 May 1875, the Volksraad restored the Vierkleur as the official flag.

The 'Vierkleur' was in abeyance during the British occupation of the Transvaal, from 12 April 1877 to 7 August 1881. It flew again until the republic came to a final end on 31 May 1902. It was later used by the Maritz Revolt rebels who declared a resurrection of the South African Republic in 1914 and later incorporated into the national flag of South Africa from 1928 to 1994.

After the adoption of the 1928 flag, the Vierkleur has been used by far-right groups opposed to societal reform and racial integration, such as the Afrikaner Weerstandsbeweging. 

The Anglo-Boer War Museum in Bloemfontein flies the Vierkleur (together with the flag of the Orange Free State and that of the present Republic of South Africa). The Vierkleur and the Burgers Flag figure among other flags of Boer republics on display in the Cenotaph Hall of the Voortrekker Monument near Pretoria.

Potchefstroom adopted the Burgers Flag as city flag.

Descriptions

'Vierkleur'
The flag was simply the flag of the Netherlands with the addition of a green vertical band at the hoist.  The Volksraad resolution of 18 February 1858 which confirmed the design stated that the motto 'Eendracht maakt macht' (cf. coat of arms of the Transvaal) should be placed on the flag, but this was never done.

'Burgers Flag'
The flag is blue, charged with a red saltire fimbriated in white.

See also

 Coat of arms of the Transvaal
 List of South African flags
 Flag of the Cape Colony
 Flag of Goshen
 Flag of Natal
 Flag of the Natalia Republic
 Flag of the Nieuwe Republiek
 Flag of the Orange Free State
 Flag of the Orange River Colony
 Flag of South Africa (1928–1994)
 Flag of Stellaland
 Flag of Transvaal
 Flags of the Confederate States of America
 Flag of the United Arab Emirates

References

Bibliography
 Brownell, F.G. (1993).  National and Provincial Symbols.
 Burgers, A.P. (1997).  Sovereign Flags over Southern Africa.
 Burgers, A.P. (2008).  The South African Flag Book.
 Pama, C. (1965).  Lions and Virgins.

Flags of South Africa
Historical flags
South African heraldry